"It's a Cheating Situation" is a song recorded by American country music artists Moe Bandy and Janie Fricke. It was released in January 1979 as the first single and title track from Bandy's album It's a Cheating Situation. The song peaked at number 2 on the Billboard Hot Country Singles chart. It also reached number 1 on the RPM Country Tracks chart in Canada.  The song was written by Sonny Throckmorton and Curly Putman.

Charts

Weekly charts

Year-end charts

References

1979 singles
Moe Bandy songs
Janie Fricke songs
Songs written by Curly Putman
Songs written by Sonny Throckmorton
Male–female vocal duets